Hoppy's Holiday is a 1947 American Western film directed by George Archainbaud and written by J. Benton Cheney, Bennett Cohen and Ande Lamb. The film stars William Boyd, Andy Clyde, Rand Brooks, Mary Ware, Andrew Tombes and Leonard Penn. The film was released on July 18, 1947, by United Artists.

Plot

Cast 
 William Boyd as Hopalong Cassidy
 Andy Clyde as California Carlson
 Rand Brooks as Lucky Jenkins
 Mary Ware as Gloria Patton
 Andrew Tombes as Mayor Frank Patton
 Leonard Penn as Dunning
 Jeff Corey as Jed
 Donald Kirke as Sheriff
 Mike Ragan as Henchman Ace 
 Gil Patric as Henchman Hill 
 Frank Henry as Henchman Bart

References

External links 
 
 
 
 

1947 films
American black-and-white films
Films directed by George Archainbaud
United Artists films
American Western (genre) films
1947 Western (genre) films
Hopalong Cassidy films
1940s English-language films
1940s American films